The Chinese Ambassador to Turkmenistan is the official representative of the People's Republic of China to Turkmenistan.

List of representatives

References 

Turkmenistan
China
Ambassadors